Lilli may refer to:

Films
Lilli (1919 film), a German film
Lilli (2018 film), an Indian film

Places
Lilli, Harju County, a village in Anija Parish, Harju County, Estonia
Lilli, Viljandi County, a village in Karksi Parish, Viljandi County, Estonia

Other uses
Bild Lilli doll, a German doll based on the comic-strip character Lilli from the newspaper Bild

People with the given name
 Lilli Henoch (1899–1942), German track and field athlete
 Lilli Lehmann (1848–1929), German operatic soprano
 Lilli Promet (1922–2007), Estonian writer
 Lilli Suburg (1841–1923), Estonian journalist, writer and feminist

See also
Lili (disambiguation)
Lille (disambiguation)
Lilley (disambiguation)
Lillie (disambiguation)
Lillis (disambiguation)
Lilly (disambiguation)
Lily (disambiguation)

Estonian feminine given names
German feminine given names